Acentrogobius caninus, also known as the tropical sand goby or green-shouldered goby, is an amphidromous benthopelagic species of fish in the family Gobiidae. 

It is endemic throughout the Indo-West Pacific and found throughout marine, fresh, and brackish water. It is recognisable by its grey body with brown markings across its body, as well as the distinct dark green spot above its pectoral fins.

References 

caninus
Fish of Thailand
Fish of Malaysia
Fish of the Philippines
Fish of Indonesia
Taxa named by Achille Valenciennes
Fish described in 1837